Tirukostiyur was former constituency in the Tamil Nadu Legislative Assembly of Tamil Nadu a southern state of India. It was in Sivaganga district.

Members of Legislative Assembly

Election results

1962

1957

References

External links
 

Sivaganga district
Former assembly constituencies of Tamil Nadu